Alan James Burridge (born 8 October 1936) is an English former sportsman and administrator. He had an extensive Minor Counties cricket career through the 1960s and 1970s. He was secretary of Middlesex County Cricket Club from 1980 to 1981.

Personal life
Burridge was born in Sunderland, County Durham. His father, Fred, was the groundsman at Roker Park and previously worked on the groundstaff at Lord's. Having completed his national service in the Royal Air Force, he worked variously as a salesman, in a bank, as director of a sports centre, and as a teacher at Enfield Grammar School. He played many sports including cricket and football, at one time playing as centre-forward for Gateshead in non-league football.

Cricket career
Between 1961 and 1978, Burridge played 123 matches in the Minor Counties Championship, for Durham, Lincolnshire and Hertfordshire. During that time he also played 36 List A cricket matches for Durham, Hertfordshire and the Minor Counties North, South and West teams in the Benson and Hedges and Gillette Cup competitions. In 1972, he won two man-of-the-match awards in List A games, the first while playing for Minor Counties North in the Benson and Hedges, and the second playing for Durham in the Gillette. He also played for the Minor Counties team in one first class match against the touring West Indians in 1973.

Having worked as amenities and recreation manager at Watford Borough Council for many years, Burridge was appointed secretary of Middlesex in 1980, succeeding Arthur Flower. In 1981, prior to Ian Botham's resignation as England captain, Burridge was approached by England chairman of selectors Alec Bedser to ask then Middlesex captain Mike Brearley if he would be willing to captain England again. Burridge resigned as Middlesex secretary in August 1981.

References

External links

1936 births
Living people
English cricketers
Minor Counties cricketers
Durham cricketers
Hertfordshire cricketers
Lincolnshire cricketers
English cricket administrators
Secretaries of Middlesex County Cricket Club
Footballers from Sunderland
Cricketers from Sunderland
Gateshead F.C. players
Association football forwards
English footballers